Steven Lugerner is an American, San Francisco-based jazz and classical musician. Lugerner attended the New School in New York City.

His debut solo album was the double-CD Narratives/These Are Words. These Are Words is a set of compositions based on verses in The Torah, and is played by Lugerner with trumpeter Darren Johnston, pianist Myra Melford, and drummer Matt Wilson. Narratives is played by a septet. Lugerner has since gone on to release multiple albums - Live at The Bunker (2012), For We Have Heard (2013), Gravitations Vol 1 featuring Angelo Spagnolo (2013), and Gravitations Vol 2 featuring Fred Hersch (2015). His Jacknife album used the compositions of Jackie McLean and was released in 2016.

Lugerner is Manager of Education Programs at the Stanford Jazz Workshop.

References

Living people
American Jews
American jazz saxophonists
American classical saxophonists
Jews and Judaism in New York City
The New School alumni
American male jazz musicians
Year of birth missing (living people)
Jazz musicians from New York (state)
NoBusiness Records artists